.istanbul and .ist  are approved top level domains (TLD) for the Internet. It is a community-based sponsored top-level domain by Istanbul Metropolitan Municipality and subsidiary Medya A.Ş. According to the Medya A.Ş., .istanbul will improve awareness on Istanbul's historical heritage and help economic growth by allowing unlimited and open registration of the names.

Along with TLDs such as .cat and .asia, .istanbul and other new TLDs fall into the new category of GeoTLDs.

See also
.tr

References

Istanbul
Culture in Istanbul
Computer-related introductions in 2016